Ciudad de Plasencia Club de Fútbol is a football team based in Plasencia in the autonomous community of Extremadura. Founded in 1998, it plays in Tercera División – Group 14.

Season to season

8 seasons in Tercera División

External links
Futbolme team profile 

Football clubs in Plasencia
Association football clubs established in 1998
1998 establishments in Spain